Bazarsad Jargalsaihan (Базарсадын Жаргалсайхан) was born in 1959. He is the founder and owner of the Buyan Holding company. In society he is generally called Buyangiin Jagaa. He was elected to parliament in 2004, and served until 2008. He was leader of the Mongolian Republican Party.

He obtained his higher education in East Germany, where he began to engage in small entrepreneurial activities. After the completion of his higher education, he returned to Mongolia, and became a supporter of pro-democratic movements by the end of the communist era. Between 1990 and 2004, he was regarded as one of the richest people in the country.

Experience 

1984-1985 Assistant worker in Govi corporation.

1985-1988 Private business

1989-1992 Founded his "Buyan" company as a small entity

1992-1996 “Buyan” became and Limited company, Executive director

1996-2004 “Buyan Holding” Co Ltd, executive director

2004-2008 Member of parliament

2006 Member of cabinet, minister of trade and industry.

References

1959 births
Members of the State Great Khural
Living people
Mongolian Republican Party politicians
Government ministers of Mongolia